Across the River is a British drama film directed by Warren B. Malone and starring Elizabeth Healey and Kier Charles.

Plot

Cast
 Elizabeth Healey as Emma
 Kier Charles as Ryan
 Liz Richardson as Patte
 Tomasz Alexander as Smoker
 Leon Ockenden as Cake Shop Owner
 Gillian MacGregor as Joanna
 Marlon Blue as Noah
 Rowena Perkins as Pretty Girl
 Pippa Abrahams as Car Lady
 Steven Blake as Sand Sculptor
 Theo Kalliades as Dheli Employee
 Nick Lashbrook as Henry
 Drew P. as Sandy
 Harper Taylor as Georgie
 Tat Whalley as Simon

Filming locations
Filming took place in London, England, UK.

Release 
The film was released on 28 December 2016.

References

External links 
 

2010s English-language films